The 1984 Copa del Rey Final was the 82nd final of the Copa del Rey. The final was played at Santiago Bernabéu Stadium in Madrid, on 5 May 1984, being won by Athletic Bilbao, who beat Barcelona 1–0. The match is well known due to a huge brawl between players at the end of the game.

Details

See also
Athletic–Barcelona clásico

References

1984
Copa
Athletic Bilbao matches
FC Barcelona matches
1980s in Madrid
Sports competitions in Madrid